Elizabeth J. Rastall was an American female tennis player who was active at the turn of the 19th and 20th century.

Career
Rastall won the mixed doubles title at the U.S. Championships in 1902. Together with her partner Albert Hoskins they defeated Jane Craven and James Gardner.

Grand Slam finals

Doubles (2 runner-ups)

Mixed doubles (1 title, 1 runner-up)

References

Year of birth missing
American female tennis players
United States National champions (tennis)
Year of death missing
Grand Slam (tennis) champions in mixed doubles